Charles S. Postles Jr. is an American politician. He is a Republican member of the Delaware House of Representatives, representing District 33.

Electoral history
In 2016, Postles won the three-way Republican primary with 714 votes (45.2%) to replace Harold Peterman, who had died in office. He went on to win the general election with 5,780 votes total (57.5%) against Democratic nominee Karen D. Williams.
In 2018, Postles won the general election with 5,001 votes total (60.5%) against Democratic nominee James Todd Webb.

References

External links
Official page at the Delaware General Assembly
 

Living people
University of Delaware alumni
Republican Party members of the Delaware House of Representatives
21st-century American politicians
Year of birth missing (living people)